is a railway station on the Ōu Main Line in the city of Yuzawa, Akita Prefecture,  Japan, operated by JR East.

Lines
Innai Station is served by the Ōu Main Line, and is located 194.4 km from the terminus of the line at Fukushima Station.

Station layout
The station consists of one side platform and one island platform connected to the station building by a footbridge. The station is unattended.

Platforms

History
Innai Station opened on October 21, 1904, as a station on the Japanese Government Railways (JGR). The JGR became the Japan National Railways (JNR) after World War II. The station has been unattended since December 1979. The station was absorbed into the JR East network upon the privatization of the JNR on April 1, 1987. The original station building was destroyed by a fire on February 2, 1988. The current building, completed in March 1989, also serves as a local history museum.

Passenger statistics
In fiscal 2007, the station was used by an average of 47 passengers daily (boarding passengers only).

Surrounding area
Innai Station is located in the small hamlet of Innai, in the Ogachi area of southern Yuzawa City.  Innai itself has few businesses, though central Ogachi, just to the north, has many.  About 12 kilometers to the SE lies Akinomiya Onsen, a popular hot spring resort area.

See also
List of railway stations in Japan

References

External links

 JR East Station information 

Railway stations in Japan opened in 1904
Railway stations in Akita Prefecture
Ōu Main Line
Yuzawa, Akita